Criorhina  is a genus of hoverflies. Medium to large sized species, black or greenish black, with or without light ground markings mimicking bumblebees .The  head  is much flattened and broader than the thorax. The antennae are situated upon a prominent conical frontal process, The face is moderately produced below the eyes, downward or forward, in profile. The eyes are bare.  The abdomen is elliptical or very short oval. Larvae found in rot holes or decaying hardwoods

Gallery

Species

References

Hoverfly genera
Taxa named by Johann Wilhelm Meigen
Diptera of Europe
Diptera of Asia
Diptera of North America
Eristalinae